Fancelli may refer to:

Luca Fancelli (1430-1494), Italian architect
Cosimo Fancelli (1620-1688), Italian sculptor
Chiarissimo Fancelli (?-1632), Italian sculptor
Domenico Fancelli (1469-1519), Italian sculptor
Pietro Fancelli (1764-?), Italian painter
Petronio Fancelli (1734-1800), Italian painter
Giacomo Antonio Fancelli (1619-1671), Italian sculptor

Italian-language surnames